Resuscitate is the third studio album by contemporary Christian music band Remedy Drive. It was released on September 18, 2012, through Centricity Music. The album was produced by Peter Kipley at The Bomb Shelter in Brentwood, Tennessee.

The first radio single was "Better Than Life" that charted at No. 46 on the Billboard Christian Songs chart. "Resuscitate Me" was the No. 1 Billboard Christian Rock song. The album debut on the Billboard Christian and Heatseekers Albums charts at Nos. 23 and 20 respectively.

Background
David Zach said to Grace S. Aspinwall of CCM Magazine that "'the album, Resuscitate was really born out of a time of grieving...the thrill of being on the radio was so exciting when we started out, and getting to tour with bands that we had looked up to was so much fun. But at the same time, we missed our families so much, and it really wore us out. My brothers decided that it was time to move on to something else.'"

The album was recorded at The Bomb Shelter in Brentwood, Tennessee, in 2012. The album was produced by Peter Kipley.

Singles
The first radio single was "Better Than Life". This song has attained No. 46 on the Billboard Christian Songs chart, which happed on August 19, 2012. The second single was "Resuscitate Me". The song has charted at No. 1 on the Billboard Christian Rock chart, for the week of October 13, 2012.

Critical reception

Ken Wiegman of Alpha Omega News said that "'Resuscitate' is a power-rock album with positive uplifting messages and it shows a lot of potential.  I think the new lineup is going to carry on well where the brothers have left off."

CCM Magazine'''s Andy Argyrakis said that "Remedy Drive continues to be one of the most muscular and meaningful acts in today's modern rock world. Whether singing of their daily reliance on the Lord throughout 'Better Than Life' or offering stadium-shaking praise throughout 'Glory,' there's plenty of meat in the message."

Christian Music Zine's Joshua Andre said that the album is "filled with guitar driven piano pop and raw organic rock moments, that remind me of Switchfoot, Skillet and Kutless, I can say that this 10 track passionately sung and lyrically sound album is one of the best this year. Who said that a band can’t sound the same, or even better, with only one original member?" In addition, Andre wrote that he "once thought that reinvention and rebirth of a band was not possible with one remaining member- even if that member was the founder and lead singer. David Zach has proved me wrong, with his hard work in scouring new members for the new Remedy Drive- and boy have they succeeded! With 10 moving, raw, and sometimes emotional, but always earnest and heartfelt tracks; the Centricity Music band have captured a place in my heart, and hopefully in the hearts of many. In my opinion, this is a real challenge (or threat) for many Dove Awards- David and new members Corey, Tim and Dave have stayed true to the alternative rock sound, with a sprinkling of piano pop, and also reminded us that God is near, and have given us many moments to mull over."

Cross Rhythms' Matthew Griggs said that "'Resuscitate' is a great re-introduction to a band that bring to the table a varied take on a rock-worship album. The combination of anthems, honest ballads and heavier rock epics make this a refreshing listen." Griggs compared the band to the likes Switchfoot and Coldplay.

Indie Vision Music's Jonathan Andre said that "Resuscitate is full of rock melody goodness as I hear for the bands universal appeal- still holding onto their roots of faith, while also branching out to create songs that can easily be played on mainstream radio. At times sounding like Switchfoot frontman Jon Foreman, David’s infectious and enthusiastic vocals has created an album worthy of a potential Dove Award nomination next year". Furthermore, Andre wrote that "as we have this eternal glory to look forward to, we can rest in the meantime in the songs that Remedy Drive has given to us- a bit of piano, guitar and drums moulded together to create different genre-related melodies all with the same focus- reminding creation of a Creator who has our future in His hands- urging us to trust Him as we open our hearts to His invading and pursuing love and redemption." Andre likewise compared them to Switchfoot, Skillet, Kutless and Superchick.

Jesus Freak Hideout's Nathaniel Schexnayder said that "musically, I've spent a bit of time here comparing Resuscitate to Daylight Is Coming. Even after the first spin, it's obvious that the debut is superior in most respects and Resuscitate qualifies perfectly for the supposed 'sophomore slump,' which is unfortunate since it took Remedy Drive four years to get here. However, albums must stand on their own, and, although it isn't quite the breath of fresh air Daylight Is Coming was, Resuscitate qualifies as a solid pop rock project with enough highlights to get by."

Jesus Freak Hideout's John DiBiase said that the album "with everything new in place except for vocalist David Zach, one might expect Remedy Drive to sound entirely different, but Resuscitate retains the heart and soul of the band through Zach's hopeful lyrics and unique vocals. However, a quick listen to the album may disappoint some fans who enjoyed the somewhat more raw sound the jam band had brought to the piano pop rock table with Daylight Is Coming (Which, honestly, I thought could have even used a little less polish then). But further listens to Resuscitates more shiny packaging reveal the gems within." Additionally, DiBiase wrote that "as a pop rock record, Resuscitate is among some of the best of the year, while those maybe hoping to find a little more of the raw energy of their live show captured on this record might be a little disappointed. Regardless, Resuscitate remains a strong batch of songs from a band that I can expect only bigger things from in the near future as they continue to rediscover their proverbial footing as this new foursome."

New Release Tuesday's Kelly Sheads said that "despite the many changes and adjustments David Zach has had to make over the past year and a half to keep his vision for Remedy Drive alive, Resuscitate is evidence that the new foursome is on track to continue what was originally started over 10 years ago. While each new bandmate brings their own unique musicianship to the table, the familiar piano-driven melodies and hopeful lyrics that set Remedy Drive apart from their peers, remains front and center. After listening to Resuscitate, loyal and longtime fans can rest easy knowing the sound they've grown to love is still in good hands."

New Release Tuesday's Jay Wright said that "Remedy Drive has been together for many years, but now as a new-old band, their future is very bright. Their Resuscitate album is definitely their greatest release to date, and I see many accolades and awards in store for this band and this new album, which gets better with every listen."

ONCOURSE MAGAZINE'''s Jennifer Taylor said that the album is "perfect for any sunny, autumn afternoon drive, you will want to check out Remedy Drive's recent release Resuscitate. With beautiful melodies and great lyrics, the music makes for a beautiful worship and uplifting experience." Plus, Taylor wrote that the band is "similar to Switchfoot's sound, Resuscitate is the seventh recording album release for Remedy Drive. Each song has a great message of encouragement".

The Phantom Tollbooth's Michael Dalton said that "this was not a band on life-support but in the throes of demise. That such a solid release has emerged, one that must rank among their best work, is a tribute to Zach’s persistence and the synergy he has with the new members." Continuing on, Dalton wrote that "on different note, if Coldplay helped bring the piano back to rock, Remedy Drive benefits from that legacy. The creative use of keyboards woven into the fabric of many of these songs is striking."Worship Leaders Amanda Furbeck said that "it is not often that Rock 'n' Roll occupies the same space as such heavyweight Church fathers as C.S. Lewis, but Remedy Drive takes the heart of his theology and makes it live renewed in rock music. This must be their specialty, as aptly-titled Resuscitate is a glorious debut of an old band made new again. Remedy Drive is high-energy and highly driven. Resuscitate also reveals beautiful moments of purposeful clarity juxtaposed to plaintive unison cries of feeling lost, sparkling piano, cleverly spun lyrics, hard-hitting drums, and well-crafted vocal lines that come together to spread a light in the darkness of this world."

Track listing

Charts

Notes

References

2012 albums
Centricity Music albums
Remedy Drive albums